The Dambuilders was an indie rock band that began in Honolulu, Hawaii, USA, in 1989 and later relocated to Boston. They released seven LPs (six studio albums & one compilation) and a number of EPs before breaking up in 1998. Members have gone on with other musical projects, including the band's violinist/vocalist, Joan Wasser, as Joan as Police Woman. Kevin March also became well known in indie circles as the drummer of the band Guided by Voices, which he joined in 2002. Dave Derby is the leader and main songwriter of the New York City-based collective of artists known as Gramercy Arms, which has included collaborations with both Wasser and March.

History

Founding
The Dambuilders was a band in the early 1990s Boston rock scene. The founding members—Dave Derby, Tryan George and Eric Masunaga, all from Hawaii—had played in a number of bands (such as the Exactones) before moving to Boston in 1990. The band began as the Dambuilders in Hawaii in a three-piece and four-piece configuration. Early violin was provided by Debbie Fox. With Fox's involvement, nearly all of the band's songs had electric violin tracks. Around 1992, the "classic line-up" consisted of Derby (bass guitar and lead vocals), Masunaga (guitar), Kevin March (drums) and Joan Wasser (violin). Many of the band's early recordings were engineered by Masunaga.

Commercial success
While the Dambuilders are generally considered an "indie" band, they received some commercial airplay with the single "Shrine" from their 1994 Atlantic Records release Encendedor. The song tells of a cross-cultural romantic courtship between the singer and a girl who "doesn't speak much English" but is familiar with the American music scene. In the song, the singer is willing to conform to traditional religious practices outside his own cultural sphere ("...if I stay with her I'll lose track of all time, so I light a candle to the shrine..."), but seemingly manages to stay true to his roots by redefining the acts as an aspect of his own non-religious, culturally inclusive belief system ("...and call it Rock n' Roll"). "Shrine" was ranked No. 17 in MTV's 100 Greatest Songs of the '90s: Lollapalooza list.

Their final studio album, Against the Stars, was released in 1997 by Elektra Records. In 1999, the band performed in Toronto.

After the Dambuilders
Derby later assembled Gramercy Arms, a "revolving collective of musicians and artists". Both Wasser and March have contributed, with Wasser appearing on both of their albums, including a vocal duet with Lloyd Cole on the band's "Beautiful Disguise" single and video. The band has also featured Cole, Sean Eden (Luna), Rainy Orteca (Dead Air, Joan as Police Woman, Lloyd Cole), Hilken Mancini (The Count Me Outs, Fuzzy, Colburn-Mancini) and Sandy Smallens (Too Much Joy), as well as guest performances by Doug Gillard (Guided By Voices), Matthew Caws (Nada Surf), Renee LoBue (Elk City) and Chris Brokaw (Come, Codeine). They are scheduled to release their third album in early 2023. Derby's other output includes two releases under the "Brilliantine" name, as well as two solo albums: Even Further Behind (2003) and Dave Derby and the Norfolk Downs (2007).

Wasser began performing under the name Joan as Police Woman, releasing her first self-titled solo EP in June 2005. She released a full-length album, entitled Real Life, in June 2006, followed by To Survive (2008), Cover (2009), The Deep Field (2011), The Classic (2014), Let It Be You (2016), with Benjamin Lazar Davis, Damned Devotion (2018), Joanthology (2019), Cover Two (2020) and The Solution Is Restless (2021), with Tony Allen and Dave Okumu.

March was also a member of Guided by Voices for several years and continues to do session work and tour with various artists. In 2005, he formed Hot One with his old friend Nathan Larson of Shudder to Think, releasing one self-titled album in 2006. 

Masunaga now runs Modulus Studios, a mastering and DVD authoring studio, in Boston.

Discography

Studio albums
 1989: A Young Person's Guide (¡Cuacha!)
 1991: Geek Lust (¡Cuacha!)
 1993: Islington Porn Tapes (¡Cuacha!)
 1994: Encendedor (Elektra)
 1995: Ruby Red (Elektra)
 1997: Against the Stars (Elektra)

Compilations
 1996: God Dambuilders Bless America (Elektra)

Singles
 1991: "Pop Song = Food"
 1992: "Smell"
 1992: "Shrine"
 1995: "Teenage Loser Anthem"

Extended plays
 1993: Tough Guy Problem (spinART)

References

External links

 VH1 page
 "Joan As Police Woman"
 Gramercy Arms Facebook page
 "Gramercy Arms website"

Rock music groups from Massachusetts
Musical groups from Boston
Musical groups from Hawaii
Rock music groups from Hawaii
Musical groups established in 1989
Musical groups disestablished in 1998